The 1977 Rose Bowl was a college football bowl game played on January 1, 1977. It was the 63rd Rose Bowl Game. The USC Trojans, champions of the Pacific-8 Conference, defeated the Michigan Wolverines, champions of the Big Ten Conference, 

USC quarterback Vince Evans was named the Rose Bowl Player of the Game, and Trojan freshman tailback Charles White, subbing for Heisman Trophy runner-up Ricky Bell, who was injured in the first quarter, rushed for 114 yards and  It was the third consecutive win for the Pac-8 in the Rose Bowl, and the seventh of the

Teams

Michigan
Michigan won their first eight games and spent most of the season ranked first in the polls, until a  upset loss to Purdue on November 6. They capped off their Big Ten championship with a  shutout of arch rival Ohio State; they were ranked second in both major polls at the end of the regular season.

USC
Under first-year head coach John Robinson, USC was upset in the season opener at home by Missouri,  It was the Trojans' fifth-straight regular season loss, dating back to the prior season when John McKay had announced his end-of-season resignation (leaving for the expansion Tampa Bay Buccaneers of the NFL). USC won the rest of their games in 1976, climaxed by a  win over #2 UCLA to clinch the conference  and a subsequent 17–13 victory over

Scoring

First quarter
 No scoring

Second quarter
 Michigan - Rob Lytle, 1-yard run (Bob Wood kick blocked)
 USC - Vince Evans, 1-yard run (Walker kick)

Third quarter
 No scoring

Fourth quarter
 USC - Charles White, 7-yard run (Walker kick)

Aftermath
Undefeated Pittsburgh, led by Heisman Trophy winner Tony Dorsett, was the consensus #1 team entering the bowls and played #4 Georgia in the Sugar Bowl in New Orleans. USC and Michigan hoped Georgia would upset Pitt to set up the Rose Bowl as a national championship showdown, but Pitt had a dominant  win earlier in the day to keep its top ranking in the  USC finished second and Michigan dropped only

References

External links
 Summary at Bentley Historical Library, University of Michigan Athletics History

Rose Bowl
Rose Bowl Game
Michigan Wolverines football bowl games
USC Trojans football bowl games
Rose Bowl
January 1977 sports events in the United States